"Welcome Back" is a song by American rapper Mase. It was released as the first single off his third studio album Welcome Back. It marked the first single that Mase had released since 1999's "Get Ready", after he had taken a 5-year hiatus from the music industry.

"Welcome Back" garnered positive reception from critics who praised its catchability. The song peaked at number 8 on the Billboard Hot Rap Songs chart and number 32 on the Hot 100 chart. It also reached number 17 on both the Hot Rap Songs and Rhythmic charts respectively. The song has been certified gold by the Recording Industry Association of America (RIAA), denoting sales of over 500,000 units in the United States. "Welcome Back" also reached the top 40 in countries like New Zealand, Switzerland and the United Kingdom.

The accompanying music video for the song, directed by Chris Robinson, parodies the opening to the children's show Mister Rogers' Neighborhood.

Critical reception
AllMusic's David Jeffries praised the track for being reminiscent of early Mase, saying that it's "lyric-filled, driven but effortless, and has a crafty interpolation of a pop tune, this time the Welcome Back, Kotter theme song." Jessica Koslow of HipHopDX put it alongside "Breathe, Stretch, Shake" as being "sure-fire radio/club joints." Rashaun Hall of Billboard said the production work by The Movement on the sample produced "infectious results." Chadwicked of Tiny Mix Tapes praised Mase for maintaining his rap flow while under a different image, saying that "It proves that a man such as Mase can rhyme over a sample from Welcome Back, Kotter; dress up like Mister Rogers in the video and have an 80-year old female back-up dancer, and still be taken seriously and appreciated."

Chart performance
"Welcome Back" debuted at number 52 on the Billboard Hot 100 for the week of June 5, 2004. It reached number 40 the week after and peaked at number 32 the week of June 19, staying on the chart for eleven weeks. On the Hot Rap Songs chart, it debuted at number 13 for the week of June 5, 2004. Three weeks later, it peaked at number 8 the week of June 26. It debuted at number 46 on the Hot R&B/Hip-Hop Songs chart and then moved to number 23 for the week of June 5, 2004. Four weeks later, it reached its peak at number 17 for the week of July 3, 2004. It reached that same position on the Rhythmic chart for the week of July 10, 2004. The song also charted in New Zealand, debuting at number 4 and staying there for four weeks, remaining on the chart for seventeen weeks. In Switzerland, it debuted at number 25 and stayed there for eight weeks and reached number 51 in Germany, with chart progression lasting for seven weeks.

Music video
Directed by Chris Robinson, the video begins as a parody of the opening to the 1968–2001 television series Mister Rogers' Neighborhood, being known in the video as Mister Betha's Neighborhood. The video also features Wyclef Jean pulling up in his Pagani Zonda and also features cameos from Sean Combs, Styles P, Loon, Amerie, Pee Wee Kirkland and Fatman Scoop.

Live performance
On August 20, 2004, Mase performed the song live on The Late Late Show with Craig Kilborn.

Remix

The official remix to "Welcome Back" is titled "It's Alright", and it is by hip-hop artist Kanye West, with Mase being a featured artist along with singer John Legend. It was featured on the bonus CD of West's 2005 video album The College Dropout Video Anthology.

Formats and track listing
Europe CD
1. "Welcome Back" (Radio Edit) – 3:45
2. "Welcome Back" (Main) – 4:23

Europe CD (Promo)
1. "Welcome Back" (Radio Edit) – 3:45

US 12"
A1. "Welcome Back" – 4:22
A2. "Welcome Back" (Instrumental) – 4:22
B1. "Breathe, Stretch, Shake" (featuring P. Diddy) – 3:17
B2. "Breathe, Stretch, Shake" (Instrumental) – 3:17

Charts and certifications

Weekly charts

Year-end charts

Certifications

Popular culture
The song appears in the 2020 MLB Opening Day video.

Release history

References

2004 singles
2004 songs
Mase songs
Kanye West songs
John Legend songs
Bad Boy Records singles
Music videos directed by Chris Robinson (director)
Song recordings produced by the Movement (production team)
Song recordings produced by Kanye West
Songs written by John Sebastian
Songs written by Mase
Songs written by Kanye West
Songs written by John Legend